Lalla Rookh is a poem written in 1817 by Irish poet Thomas Moore.

Lalla Rookh, Lala Rookh, Lalla Rooke, Lallah Rookh, Lala Rukh and other variant spellings may also refer to:

Arts
 Lala Rookh, 1958 Bollywood film
 Lalla-Roukh, 1862 comic opera by Félicien David
 Lalla Roukh, character in the 1862 opera Feramors
 Lalla Rûkh, 1821 composition by Gaspare Spontini

People
 Lala Rukh (activist) (1948–2017), Pakistani women's rights activist
 Truganini, the last Indigenous Tasmanian, nicknamed Lalla(h) Rookh

Transport
 Lalla Rookh, a GWR 2900 Class locomotive, 1905–1946
 Lalla Rookh, a GWR Waverley Class locomotive, 1855–1872
 Lalla Rookh (ship), a number of ships

Others
Lallah Rookh, a circus elephant
 "Lalla Rookh", a 19th-century house in Muswell Hill, London
 "Lalla Rookh", a house in Kew, Victoria, occupied by painter George A. J. Webb
 Lalla Rookh Bank, a volcanic seamount near Vailuluʻu in the South Pacific
 Lalla Rookh, a thoroughbred racehorse, descendant of British horse Rockavon
 Lalla Rookh Museum, a museum about the Indo-Surinamese history and culture
 Lalla Rookh Station, an agricultural landholding in Western Australia

See also
Lallah Rookh White Rockwell (1876–1940), US educationalist
 Lallah Rookh Hart, actress in silent films such as A La Cabaret (1916) and Men, Women, and Money (1919)